Clubul Sportiv Municipal Târgu Jiu is a professional basketball club from Târgu Jiu, Romania. Founded in 2017, it is the successor of Energia Târgu Jiu, dissolved in 2016. In 2018, the team promoted to the Liga Națională, as the league merged with the Liga I.

Current roster

References

External links 
 "Asociatia Club Sportiv Targu Jiu - Home" - official Facebook page
 
 "Federatia Romana de Baschet" - official site of Romanian basketball federation
 

Târgu Jiu
Basketball teams in Romania
Basketball teams established in 2017
2017 establishments in Romania